Gerald Raymond McMaster  (born 9 March 1953, in North Battleford) is a curator, artist, and author and a Plains Cree member of the Siksika Nation. McMaster is a professor at OCAD University and is the adjunct curator at the Remai Modern in Saskatoon, Saskatchewan.

Early life and education
Gerald McMaster was born in 1953 and grew up on the Red Pheasant First Nation reserve in Saskatchewan, Canada. His father is Blackfoot, while his mother is Plains Cree. He says he grew up listening to the Lone Ranger and Hopalong Cassidy on the radio, while avidly reading western comic books – all of which would later influence his art.

McMaster says, "I've been an urban Indian since the age of nine. I've attended art school in the United States, trained in the Western tradition; yet I am referred to as an 'Indian' artist. I have danced and sung in the traditional powwow style of Northern Plains, yet my musical tastes are global ..."

McMaster studied art at the Institute of American Indian Arts in Santa Fe, New Mexico, from 1973 to 1975. He earned his BFA from the Minneapolis College of Art and Design in Minneapolis, Minnesota. He earned his master's degree in Anthropology and Sociology at Carleton University in Ottawa, Ontario, and continued his studies at the University of Amsterdam in the Netherlands.

Artwork
McMaster draws and paints with humour and an ironic juxtaposition of traditional and contemporary pop culture elements. Identities, fluid and multiple, are central to his art practice. In his piece Eclectic Baseball, "traditional Plains Indian symbols of warfare and sacred ceremony were freely mixed with symbols and actual equipment of contemporary baseball". One of his best known series is The cowboy/Indian Show. Hide painting, pictographs, and petroglyphs inspire his methods of representation. He works in oil and acrylic.

In 1995, he ceased being a full-time artist in order to devote more time to curating, critical theory, and writing.

Career

From 1977 to 1981, McMaster coordinated the Indian Art Program and was an instructor at the Saskatchewan Indian Federated College at the University of Regina in Saskatchewan. Beginning in 1981, he was curator of Contemporary Indian Art at the Canadian Museum of Civilization in Ottawa.

McMaster has curated a number of thought-provoking contemporary Native art shows, including INDIGENA at the Canadian Museum of Civilization. In 2011, he curated with Ingo Hessel Inuit Modern at the Art Gallery of Ontario in Toronto. In 1995, McMaster curated Edward Poitras's exhibition at the Biennale di Venezia. In 2005, Poitras, of Gordon First Nation, was the first aboriginal artist to represent Canada in the Biennale di Venezia.

He served as the director's special assistant and deputy assistant director for cultural resources at the National Museum of the American Indian in New York City from 2000 to 2004. He worked with the permanent collections there, as well as curating the shows, First American Art in 2004 and New Tribe/New York in 2005.

He was curator of Canadian art at the Art Gallery of Ontario until 2012, when he was succeeded by Andrew Hunter.

Awards and honors
 2005 - the Order of Canada. 
 2005 - National Aboriginal Achievement Award.
 2022 - Governor General's Awards in Visual and Media Arts.

Selected published works
 McMaster, Gerald. Iljuwas Bill Reid: Life & Work. Toronto: Art Canada Institute, 2020. .
 McMaster, Gerald and Clifford E. Trafzer, eds. Native Universe: Voices of Indian America: Native American Tribal Leaders, Writers, Scholars, and Story Tellers. National Geographic, 2008. .
 McMaster, Gerald and Joe Baker, ed. Remix: New Modernities in a Post-Indian World. Washington DC: National Museum of the American Indian, 2007. .
 McMaster, Gerald, Bruce Bernstein, Kathleen Ash-Milby, eds. First American Art: The Charles and Valerie Diker Collection of American Indian Art. Washington DC: National Museum of the American Indian, 2004. .
 McMaster, Gerald. Reservation X. Seattle: University of Washington Press, 1999. .
 McMaster, Gerald. The New Tribe: Critical Perspectives and Practices in Aboriginal Contemporary Art. Amsterdam: Acedemisch Proefschrift, University of Amsterdam, 1999. ASIN B001ELWQLK.
 McMaster, Gerald. "Museums and Galleries as Sites for Artistic Intervention", In The Subjects of Art History: Historical Objects in Contemporary Perspectives. Eds. Mark A. Cheetham, Michael Ann Holly, and Keith Moxey. Oxford: Oxford University Press: 250–261. 1998.
 McMaster, Gerald. Jeffery Thomas: Portraits from the Dancing Grounds. Exhibition catalogue. Ottawa: Ottawa Art Gallery, 1996
 McMaster, Gerald. Mary Longman: Traces. Exhibition catalogue. Kamloops, BC: Kamloops Art Gallery, 1996.
 McMaster, Gerald and Lee-Ann Martin. Indigena. Contemporary native perspectives in Canadian art. 1992. ASIN B0010YFFSC.
 McMaster, Gerald, Jennifer S. H. Brown, Clara Harfittay, and Shirley J. R. Madill. Robert Houle: Indians from A to Z. Goose Lance Editions, 1990. .
 McMaster, Gerald. Edward Poitras: Canada Xlvi Biennale Di Venezia. Seattle: University of Washington Press, 1995. .

Notes

References
Newlands, Anne. Canadian Paintings, Prints and Drawings. Richmond Hill, Ontario: Firefly Books, 2007. .
Ryan, Allan J. The Trickster Shift: Humour and Irony in Contemporary Native Art. Victoria: University of British Columbia Press, 1999. .
G. R. Mcmaster, 1953– at the University of Amsterdam Album Academicum website

External links
Gerald McMaster's art, on Britesites:     

1953 births
Living people
First Nations painters
Artists from Ontario
Canadian art curators
Indigenous curators of the Americas
Members of the Order of Canada
20th-century First Nations writers
Carleton University alumni
University of Amsterdam alumni
Institute of American Indian Arts alumni
Indspire Awards
21st-century First Nations writers
Governor General's Award in Visual and Media Arts winners
Red Pheasant Cree Nation
Siksika Nation people